Cleverson Rosário dos Santos known simply as Cleverson (born  17 December 1983 in Cachoeira do Sul (Rio Grande do Sul), Brazil) is a Brazilian professional footballer who currently plays for Cuiabá Esporte Clube. He usually plays in the attacking midfielder position.

Club career
After stand out and win the Championship by Chapecoense Catarinense 2011, [1] was hired by Cleverson Avaí to operate in the Brazilian Championship Serie A. [2] His debut for the team in Florianopolis, occurred on June 26, 2011 in a game valid for the Brazilian Championship in which Avai was defeated by 1–0 to Fluminense in Ressacada. [3] in his ninth game for Avai Cleverson noted his first goal for the club. It was a beautiful shot from outside the area, [4] scoring the third goal in the game where Avai beat Ceara 3-0 by the Presidente Vargas stadium in Fortaleza. [5]
On October 22, 2011, Cleverson marks a home run. In the game in which Avai beat Botafogo in Ressacada by 3-2 by the 31st round of the Brazilian Championship, Cleverson marked by bicycle, the second goal of the team. [6] [7] After not much advantage in Avaí in season 2012, Cleverson was negotiated with the Nautical. [8]

On September 23, 2012, its loan agreement with Nautical was terminated and he returned to Avai, to play the last 12 games remaining at Lion Island, in Serie B Brasileirão.

On 28 September 2013, aged almost 28, Cleverson, joined the Iranian Premier League club, Esteghlal with an 18-month contract.

Club career statistics

 Assist Goals

Honours

Club
Atlético Paranaense
 Campeonato Paranaense - 2005

Fortaleza
 Campeonato Cearense - 2007

Chapecoense
 Campeonato Catarinense - 2011

Avaí
 2012 Campeonato Catarinense

References

External links
 Stats in soccerway https://int.soccerway.com/players/cleverson-rosario-dos-santos/9014/
 

1983 births
Living people
Brazilian footballers
Primeira Liga players
Avaí FC players
Brazilian expatriate footballers
Sportspeople from Rio Grande do Sul
Association football midfielders

zh:法比奧·丹尼爾·真奧亞里奧